Notophyson tiresias is a moth of the subfamily Arctiinae. It was described by Pieter Cramer in 1776. It is found in Suriname.

References

Arctiinae
Moths described in 1776
Taxa named by Pieter Cramer